Genoplesium validum, commonly known as the Blackdown midge orchid, is a species of small terrestrial orchid that is endemic to the Blackdown Tableland National Park in Queensland. It has a single thin leaf fused to the flowering stem and up to thirty five greenish-brown flowers with reddish stripes and a hairy labellum. This species is treated as Corunastylis valida in Queensland.

Description
As with others in the genus, the flowers are inverted so that the labellum is above the column rather than below it. There is a dark purplish-black callus in the centre of the labellum and extending almost to its tip. Flowering occurs from December to April.

Taxonomy and naming
Genoplesium validum was first formally described in 1991 by David Jones and the description was published in Australian Orchid Research. In 2002, David Jones and Mark Clements changed the name to Corunastylis valida, a name that is accepted in Queensland but not by the Australian Plant Census. The specific epithet (validum) is a Latin word meaning "strong" or "powerful", referring to the robust habit of this orchid.

Distribution and habitat
The Blackdown midge orchid grows in sandy soil in rocky places on the Blackdown Tableland.

References

validum
Endemic orchids of Australia
Orchids of Queensland
Plants described in 1991